Cabassus or Kabassos, or Cabessus or Kabessos (Καβησσός), or Kabissos, was a town of ancient Cataonia or Cappadocia between  Tarsus and Mazaca. It was inhabited during Roman and Byzantine times.

Its site is tentatively located west of Cucusus near Doğanbeyli, Asiatic Turkey.

References

Populated places in ancient Cataonia
Populated places in ancient Cappadocia
Former populated places in Turkey
Populated places of the Byzantine Empire
Roman towns and cities in Turkey
History of Adana Province